James Girty (1743–1817) was taken prisoner by the Shawnees and afterwards was an interpreter and trader.

Biography
James Girty was the son of, an Irish immigrant, Simon Girty (died 1751) and the younger brother of Simon Girty (1741–1818). The brothers were taken prisoners by the French and Indian force which in 1756 captured Fort Granville, in what is now Mifflin County, Pennsylvania. James was adopted by the Shawnees and lived among them for three years, after which he acted as an interpreter and trader; he frequently accompanied the Indians against the English settlers, and exhibited the greatest ferocity. He conducted a profitable trading business with the Indians at Saint Marys, Ohio from 1783 to 1794, when he withdrew to Canada upon the approach of General Anthony Wayne, and again from 1795 until just before the War of 1812, when he again withdrew to Canada, where he died.

References

1743 births
1817 deaths
People from Amherstburg, Ontario
Pre-Confederation Ontario people
American people of the Northwest Indian War
People of colonial Pennsylvania
Captives of Native Americans